is a dark asteroid on an eccentric orbit, classified as near-Earth object of the Amor group. It was first observed by the Wide-field Infrared Survey Explorer (WISE) on 12 January 2010. The asteroid measures approximately 1.7 kilometers in diameter and has a low albedo of 0.03, which is rather typical for carbonaceous asteroids.

First WISE discovery 

 is expected to become the first of the many thousands of discoveries to be accredited to the WISE space telescope. However, the official discoverer will only be defined upon the asteroid's numbering.

The Mauna Kea Observatory observed it the days 18 and 19 of January, allowing the Minor Planet Center to publish a circular on January 22 confirming the discovery.

Orbit 

 orbits the Sun at a distance of 1.0–3.5 AU once every 3 years and 5 months (1,236 days). Its orbit has an eccentricity of 0.55 and an inclination of 33° with respect to the ecliptic. Due to its eccentric orbit it is also a Mars-crosser.  has the lowest possible orbital uncertainty, which may have caused it to be numbered.

Close approaches 

It does not make any notable close approaches to Earth within the next hundred years.

Physical characteristics 

According to the survey carried out by the NEOWISE mission of NASA's discovering WISE observatory,  measures 1.671 kilometers in diameter and its surface has an albedo of 0.030. Objects known for such low albedos are the carbonaceous C, D and P-type asteroids.

As of 2018, no lightcurve has been obtained. The body's rotation period, shape and pole remain unknown.

Numbering and naming 

Up until 2021, this minor planet has not been named or numbered. However it has since been numbered 614599 but is still yet to be named.

References

External links 
 MPEC 2010-B33, Minor Planet Electronic Circulars, 22 January 2010
 
 
 

614599
614599
Near-Earth objects in 2010
20100112